Arthur Henrique Peixoto Santos (born 17 May 1994), known as Arthur Henrique, is a Brazilian professional footballer who plays as a left back for São Bernardo, on loan from Ferroviária.

Career
On 2 July 2019 it was confirmed, that Henrique had joined Portuguese club Gil Vicente FC.

Honours
América de Natal
Campeonato Potiguar: 2015

 Atlético Goianiense
Campeonato Goiano: 2022

References

External links

1994 births
Living people
Brazilian footballers
Association football defenders
Campeonato Brasileiro Série A players
Campeonato Brasileiro Série C players
Campeonato Brasileiro Série D players
Primeira Liga players
América Futebol Clube (RN) players
CR Flamengo footballers
Clube Atlético Tubarão players
Associação Ferroviária de Esportes players
Atlético Clube Goianiense players
Gil Vicente F.C. players
Brazilian expatriate footballers
Brazilian expatriate sportspeople in Portugal
Expatriate footballers in Portugal
Footballers from São Paulo